Iuri Alcântara  (born 4 August 1980) is a Brazilian mixed martial artist who competed in the UFC bantamweight division. A professional MMA competitor since 2003, Alcântara mostly fought in Brazil before signing with World Extreme Cagefighting to take part in their final event. He is the brother of fellow UFC fighter Ildemar Alcântara.

Mixed martial arts career

Background and early career

Alcântara was born on the island of Marajó, Pará in Brazil. Incidentally, Alcântara takes his fighting nickname from the island and is billed as Iuri "Marajó" Alcântara. Alcântara trains at the "Striker Team" team and is managed by Wallid Ismail, the owner of the Jungle Fight promotion that Alcântara has competed in and won a championship.

Alcântara's early career was spaced out considerably. His debut fight took place in March 2004 and he would not return until June 2005, where he won twice in the space of four months. Amongst Alcântara's wins was a grand prix tournament victory in November 2009, when he defeated two fighters in a single night.

Jungle Fight
Alcântara then joined his manager's promotion, Jungle Fight, to compete at the Jungle Fight 19 event against Viscardi Andrade. He went the distance with Andrade, something that had only happened once before in his career. Alcântara won via split decision, the first decision victory in his career.

Following another win via armbar, outside of Jungle Fight, Alcântara returned for the Jungle Fight 21 event to face Armando Gomes. Alcântara claimed another first round stoppage, when he ended the fight via TKO (punches).

Alcântara entered into the lightweight grand prix at Jungle Fight 22. His opening round fight was against the highly touted, once undefeated Francisco Trinaldo. Trinaldo had previously been named as one of the top prospects in the sport of MMA, having defeated experienced veterans such as Luiz Firmino. Despite the reputation of his opponent, Alcântara was able to hand Trinaldo his first professional loss when he forced him to tap out to an armbar in the second round.

The win advanced Alcântara into the final where he faced the Peruvian Manuelo Morales. Alcântara ran through Morales, defeating him via TKO from a front kick to the body, in just 16 seconds of the opening round. With the win, Alcântara became the first ever Jungle Fight Lightweight Champion.

World Extreme Cagefighting
On 3 November 2010, it was announced that Alcântara had signed a five-fight deal with Zuffa and that his debut would come at World Extreme Cagefighting's final event, WEC 53. His opponent was Ricardo Lamas and Alcântara won via KO in the first round.

Ultimate Fighting Championship
On 28 October 2010, World Extreme Cagefighting merged with the Ultimate Fighting Championship. As part of the merger, most WEC fighters were transferred to the UFC.

Alcântara was expected to make his featherweight debut against Mackens Semerzier on 27 August 2011 at UFC 134  However, Semerzier was injured and was replaced on the card by UFC newcomer Antonio Carvalho. Carvalho also was forced from the bout, with an injury, and replaced by Felipe Arantes. He won the fight via unanimous decision.

Alcântara faced Michihiro Omigawa on 14 January 2012 at UFC 142. He won the fight via unanimous decision after rocking Omigawa on several occasions and almost submitting him with an armbar.

Alcântara faced promotional newcomer Hacran Dias on 23 June 2012 at UFC 147. Dias defeated Alcântara via unanimous decision.

Alcântara was expected to drop to bantamweight and face George Roop on 19 January 2013 at UFC on FX: Belfort vs. Bisping. However, Roop was forced out of the bout with an injury and replaced by promotional newcomer Pedro Nobre. After nearly finishing Nobre early in the first round with a submission attempt, the bout was declared a No Contest as Alcântara was ruled to have landed an inadvertent, but illegal strike to the back of Nobre's head, rendering him unable to continue at 2:11 of round 1. After the fight, UFC president Dana White accused Nobre of faking the injury.

Alcântara was expected to face Marcos Vinicius on 18 May 2013 at UFC on FX 8. However, Vinicius was forced out of the bout citing an injury. He instead faced UFC newcomer Iliarde Santos and won the fight via first-round TKO.

Alcântara faced Urijah Faber on 17 August 2013 at UFC Fight Night 26. Despite having Faber in trouble early in the first round, Alcântara was unable to stop Faber's wrestling and relentless top game and lost a unanimous decision.

Alcântara faced Wilson Reis on 15 February 2014 at UFC Fight Night 36. He won the fight via split decision.

Alcântara faced Vaughan Lee on 31 May 2014 at UFC Fight Night 41. He won the fight by KO early in the first round.

Alcântara next faced Russell Doane on 13 September 2014 at UFC Fight Night 51. He won the fight via unanimous decision.

Alcântara faced Frankie Saenz on 22 February 2015 at UFC Fight Night 61.  Despite being the heaviest betting favorite on the card, Alcântara lost the fight via unanimous decision.

Alcântara faced Leandro Issa on 1 August 2015 at UFC 190. He won the fight by unanimous decision.

Alcântara next faced Jimmie Rivera on 30 January 2016 at UFC on Fox 18. He lost the back-and-forth fight by unanimous decision. Both participants were awarded a Fight of the Night bonus.

Alcântara faced Brad Pickett on 8 October 2016 at UFC 204. He won the fight via submission in the first round and was awarded a Performance of the Night bonus.

Alcântara faced Luke Sanders on 4 March 2017 at UFC 209. After losing the first round and absorbing a number of strikes, Alcântara rallied back and won the fight via a kneebar submission in the second round and earned himself another Performance of the Night bonus.

Alcântara was briefly linked to a rematch with Felipe Arantes on 3 June 2017 at UFC 212. However, on 11 May, Arantes was pulled from the fight for undisclosed reasons and was replaced by promotional newcomer Brian Kelleher. Alcântara lost the fight via submission due to a guillotine choke in the first round.

Alcântara faced Alejandro Pérez on 9 December 2017 at UFC Fight Night 123. He lost the fight by unanimous decision.  California State Athletic Commission (CSAC) flagged Alcântara, after UFC Fight Night: Swanson vs. Ortega (also known as UFC Fight Night 123 in Fresno), of gaining more than 10% of weight from weigh-in to fight day, from  135.4 lbs to 154.6 lbs, following which the CSAC would not license Alcântara to fight another bantam weight bout in California.

Alcântara faced Joe Soto on 3 February 2018 at UFC Fight Night 125. He won the fight via technical knockout sixty-six seconds into the first round. This win earned him the Performance of the Night bonus.

Alcântara faced Cory Sandhagen on 25 August 2018 at UFC Fight Night 135. Despite locking in a very tight armbar early in the first round, he ultimately lost via technical knockout in the second round.  This fight earned him the Fight of Night award.

On 2 October 2020 it was reported Alcântara was released by UFC.

Post UFC 
In his first bout post UFC release, Alcântara made his return after 4 years off to face Daniel Bažant at FNC 7 on September 3, 2022. He lost the bout at the end of the first round via TKO stoppage due to ground and pound.

Championships and accomplishments

Mixed martial arts
Ultimate Fighting Championship
Fight of the Night (Two times) vs. Jimmie Rivera and Cory Sandhagen
Performance of the Night (Three times) vs. Brad Pickett, Luke Sanders and Joe Soto
Sherdog
UFC/MMA 'Submission of the Year' 2017 - Top 5 List #3  vs. Luke Sanders
Jungle Fight
Lightweight Champion (One time; first)

Mixed martial arts record

|-
|Loss
|align=center|36-11 (1)
|Daniel Bažant
|TKO (punches)
|FNC 7
|
|align=center|1
|align=center|4:49
|Pula, Croatia
|
|-
|Loss
|align=center|36–10 (1)
|Cory Sandhagen
|TKO (punches)
|UFC Fight Night: Gaethje vs. Vick 
|
|align=center|2
|align=center|1:01
|Lincoln, Nebraska, United States
|
|-
|Win
|align=center|36–9 (1)
|Joe Soto
|TKO (body kick and  punches)
|UFC Fight Night: Machida vs. Anders 
|
|align=center|1
|align=center|1:06
|Belém, Brazil
|
|- 
|Loss
|align=center|35–9 (1)
|Alejandro Pérez
|Decision (unanimous)
|UFC Fight Night: Swanson vs. Ortega 
|
|align=center|3
|align=center|5:00
|Fresno, California, United States
|
|-
|Loss
|align=center|35–8 (1)
|Brian Kelleher
|Submission (guillotine choke)
|UFC 212
|
|align=center|1
|align=center|1:48
|Rio de Janeiro, Brazil
|
|-
|Win
|align=center|35–7 (1)
|Luke Sanders
|Submission (kneebar)
|UFC 209
|
|align=center|2
|align=center|3:13
|Las Vegas, Nevada, United States
|
|-
| Win
| align=center|34–7 (1)
| Brad Pickett
| Submission (triangle choke)
| UFC 204
| 
| align=center|1
| align=center|1:59
| Manchester, England
| 
|-
| Loss
| align=center|33–7 (1)
| Jimmie Rivera
| Decision (unanimous)
| UFC on Fox: Johnson vs. Bader
| 
| align=center|3
| align=center|5:00
| Newark, New Jersey, United States
| 
|-
| Win
| align=center| 33–6 (1)
| Leandro Issa
| Decision (unanimous)
| UFC 190
| 
| align=center| 3
| align=center| 5:00
| Rio de Janeiro, Brazil
| 
|-
| Loss	
| align=center| 32–6 (1)
| Frankie Saenz
| Decision (unanimous)
| UFC Fight Night: Bigfoot vs. Mir
| 
| align=center| 3
| align=center| 5:00
| Porto Alegre, Brazil
| 
|-
| Win
| align=center| 32–5 (1)
| Russell Doane
| Decision (unanimous)
| UFC Fight Night: Bigfoot vs. Arlovski
| 
| align=center| 3
| align=center| 5:00
| Brasília, Brazil
| 
|-
| Win
| align=center| 31–5 (1)
| Vaughan Lee
| KO (punches)
| UFC Fight Night: Munoz vs. Mousasi
| 
| align=center| 1
| align=center| 0:25
| Berlin, Germany
| 
|-
| Win
| align=center| 30–5 (1)
| Wilson Reis
| Decision (split)
| UFC Fight Night: Machida vs. Mousasi
| 
| align=center| 3
| align=center| 5:00
| Jaraguá do Sul, Brazil
| 
|-
| Loss
| align=center| 29–5 (1)
| Urijah Faber
| Decision (unanimous)
| UFC Fight Night: Shogun vs. Sonnen
| 
| align=center| 3
| align=center| 5:00
| Boston, Massachusetts, United States
| 
|-
| Win
| align=center| 29–4 (1)
| Iliarde Santos
| KO (punches)
| UFC on FX: Belfort vs. Rockhold
| 
| align=center| 1
| align=center| 2:31
| Jaraguá do Sul, Brazil
| 
|-
| NC
| align=center| 28–4 (1)
| Pedro Nobre
| NC (punch to back of head)
| UFC on FX: Belfort vs. Bisping
| 
| align=center| 1
| align=center| 2:11
| São Paulo, Brazil
| 
|-
| Loss
| align=center| 28–4
| Hacran Dias
| Decision (unanimous)
| UFC 147
| 
| align=center| 3
| align=center| 5:00
| Belo Horizonte, Brazil
| 
|-
| Win
| align=center| 28–3
| Michihiro Omigawa
| Decision (unanimous)
| UFC 142
| 
| align=center| 3
| align=center| 5:00
| Rio de Janeiro, Brazil
| 
|-
| Win
| align=center| 27–3
| Felipe Arantes
| Decision (unanimous)
| UFC 134
| 
| align=center| 3
| align=center| 5:00
| Rio de Janeiro, Brazil
| 
|-
| Win
| align=center| 26–3
| Ricardo Lamas
| KO (punch)
| WEC 53
| 
| align=center| 1
| align=center| 3:26
| Glendale, Arizona, United States
| 
|-
| Win
| align=center| 25–3
| Manuelo Morales
| TKO (front kick to the body)
| Jungle Fight 22
| 
| align=center| 1
| align=center| 0:16
| São Paulo, Brazil
| 
|-
| Win
| align=center| 24–3
| Francisco Trinaldo
| Submission (armbar)
| Jungle Fight 22
| 
| align=center| 2
| align=center| N/A
| São Paulo, Brazil
| 
|-
| Win
| align=center| 23–3
| Francisco Mario
| Submission (kimura)
| Amazon Fight 4
| 
| align=center| 3
| align=center| 0:28
| Belém, Brazil
| 
|-
| Win
| align=center| 22–3
| Armando Gomes
| TKO (punches)
| Jungle Fight 21
| 
| align=center| 1
| align=center| N/A
| Natal, Brazil
| 
|-
| Win
| align=center| 21–3
| Joao Paulo Rodrigues
| Submission (armbar)
| Iron Man Championship 6
| 
| align=center| 1
| align=center| 2:11
| Belém, Brazil
| 
|-
| Win
| align=center| 20–3
| Viscardi Andrade
| Decision (split)
| Jungle Fight 19: Warriors 3
| 
| align=center| 3
| align=center| 5:00
| São Paulo, Brazil
| 
|-
| Win
| align=center| 19–3
| Jackson Pontes
| Submission (triangle armbar)
| Iron Man Championship 5
| 
| align=center| 1
| align=center| 0:42
| Belém, Brazil
| 
|-
| Win
| align=center| 18–3
| Marinho Rocha
| Submission (triangle choke)
| Iron Man Championship 4
| 
| align=center| 1
| align=center| 3:40
| Belém, Brazil
| 
|-
| Win
| align=center| 17–3
| Jamil Silveira
| Submission (triangle choke)
| Leal Combat: Grand Prix
| 
| align=center| 1
| align=center| 0:45
| Natal, Brazil
| 
|-
| Win
| align=center| 16–3
| Francisco Silva
| TKO (knee injury)
| Leal Combat: Grand Prix
| 
| align=center| 1
| align=center| 2:42
| Natal, Brazil
| 
|-
| Loss
| align=center| 15–3
| Mauricio Reis
| Submission (kneebar)
| Minotauro Combat 1
| 
| align=center| 1
| align=center| 0:49
| Macapá, Brazil
| 
|-
| Win
| align=center| 15–2
| Alexandre Alcântara
| TKO (punches)
| Belém Open Fight 2
| 
| align=center| 1
| align=center| 0:52
| Macapá, Brazil
|
|-
| Win
| align=center| 14–2
| Rafael Carvalho
| TKO (punches)
| Iron Man Championship 3
| 
| align=center| 1
| align=center| N/A
| Belém, Brazil
| 
|-
| Win
| align=center| 13–2
| Jimmy Nascimento
| TKO (punches)
| IMVT: Champions
| 
| align=center| 1
| align=center| 2:40
| Belém, Brazil
| 
|-
| Win
| align=center| 12–2
| Carlos Aldenis
| TKO (punches)
| Tribus de Vale Tudo 
| 
| align=center| 2
| align=center| 3:22
| Santarém, Brazil
| 
|-
| Win
| align=center| 11–2
| Jimmy Nascimento
| TKO (punches)
| Iron Man Championship 2
| 
| align=center| 1
| align=center| 1:30
| Belém, Brazil
| 
|-
| Win
| align=center| 10–2
| Furdjel de Windt
| Decision (unanimous)
| Cage Fight Event: Rumble in the Jungle
| 
| align=center| 3
| align=center| 5:00
| Paramaribo, Suriname
| 
|-
| Loss
| align=center| 9–2
| Henrique Mello
| Decision (unanimous)
| Fury FC: Fury Trials
| 
| align=center| 2
| align=center| 5:00
| Rio de Janeiro, Brazil
| 
|-
| Win
| align=center| 9–1
| Elielson Almeida
| Submission
| Midway vs. Dinamite
| 
| align=center| 1
| align=center| N/A
| Belém, Brazil
| 
|-
| Win
| align=center| 8–1
| Ronie Ronie
| Submission (rear-naked choke)
| DFC 2: The Lightweights
| 
| align=center| 1
| align=center| N/A
| Santarém, Brazil
| 
|-
| Loss
| align=center| 7–1
| Andre Luis Oliveira
| TKO (leg injury)
| Predador FC 4: Kamae
| 
| align=center| 1
| align=center| N/A
| Brazil
| 
|-
| Win
| align=center| 7–0
| Rerison Araujo
| Submission (armbar)
| Midway Fight 
| 
| align=center| 2
| align=center| N/A
| Belém, Brazil
| 
|-
| Win
| align=center| 6–0
| Ivanildo Santos
| Submission (armbar)
| EcoFight 2
| 
| align=center| 1
| align=center| 0:47
| Macapá, Brazil
| 
|-
| Win
| align=center| 5–0
| Michel Addario Bastos
| TKO (punches)
| EcoFight 2
| 
| align=center| 2
| align=center| 2:40
| Macapá, Brazil
| 
|-
| Win
| align=center| 4–0
| Rafael Addario Bastos
| KO (punches)
| Mega Combat Vale Tudo
| 
| align=center| 3
| align=center| 3:20
| Belém, Brazil
| 
|-
| Win
| align=center| 3–0
| Renenson Costa 
| Submission (armbar)
| Iron Man Vale Tudo 7
| 
| align=center| 1
| align=center| 0:11
| Macapá, Brazil
| 
|-
| Win
| align=center| 2–0
| José de Arimatéia
| Submission (armbar)
| Desafio de Gigantes 2
| 
| align=center| 1
| align=center| 2:11
| Macapá, Brazil
| 
|-
| Win
| align=center| 1–0
| Erlon Gabriel
| KO (punches)
| Super Vale Tudo: Ananindeua
| 
| align=center| 1
| align=center| 3:17
| Ananindeua, Brazil
|

See also
 List of male mixed martial artists

References

External links
 
 

1980 births
Living people
Brazilian male mixed martial artists
Lightweight mixed martial artists
Mixed martial artists utilizing Brazilian jiu-jitsu
Ultimate Fighting Championship male fighters
Brazilian practitioners of Brazilian jiu-jitsu
People awarded a black belt in Brazilian jiu-jitsu
Sportspeople from Pará